Glow is the second studio album by English rock band Reef. Produced by the band and George Drakoulias, the album was released on 27 January 1997 through Sony Soho Square and supported by the singles "Place Your Hands", "Come Back Brighter", "Consideration" and "Yer Old". Glow reached number one on the UK Albums Chart.

Recording
Glow was produced by George Drakoulias and the band; Jim Scott handled recording for nearly every track bar "Don't You Like It?", "Higher Vibration" and "Yer Old", which were done by Richard Digby Smith. Scott mixed almost every songs, except for "Don't You Like It?" (which was done by Sylvia Massy) and "Yer Old" (done by Smith). Stephen Marcussen then mastered the album at Precision Mastering.

Reception

Stephen Thomas Erlewine of music website Allmusic gave the album four out of five stars, claiming it to be "more focused and better than its predecessor [Replenish]" and describing it as "inspired" and "terrific". Rock music magazine Kerrang! ranked the album third on their 1997 "Albums of the Year" list.

Track listing
All songs by Reef, all lyrics by Gary Stringer.

Personnel
Personnel per booklet.

Reef
 Jack Bessant – bass
 Dominic Greensmith – drums
 Kenwyn House – guitar
 Gary Stringer – vocals

Additional musicians
 Benmont Tench – keyboards
 Chris Trujillo – percussion

Production and design
 George Drakoulias – producer
 Reef – producer
 Brett Finn - R & A 
 Jim Scott – recording (all except tracks 6, 8 and 11), mixing (all except tracks 6 and 11)
 Richard Digby Smith – recording (tracks 6, 8 and 11), mixing (track 11)
 Sylvia Massy – mixing (track 6)
 Stephen Marcussen – mastering
 Paul Cohen – photography

Charts

Certifications

References

1997 albums
Reef (band) albums
albums produced by George Drakoulias